Luís Manuel da Costa Silva (born 29 September 1992 in Matosinhos) is a Portuguese professional footballer who plays for U.D. Vilafranquense as a midfielder.

References

External links

1992 births
Living people
Sportspeople from Matosinhos
Portuguese footballers
Association football midfielders
Primeira Liga players
Liga Portugal 2 players
Leixões S.C. players
S.C. Braga players
S.C. Braga B players
Gil Vicente F.C. players
G.D. Chaves players
C.D. Nacional players
C.F. Os Belenenses players
C.D. Cova da Piedade players
Varzim S.C. players
U.D. Vilafranquense players
Portugal youth international footballers
Portugal under-21 international footballers